Last words are the final utterances before death. The meaning is sometimes expanded to somewhat earlier utterances.

Last words of famous or infamous people are sometimes recorded (although not always accurately) which became a historical and literary trope. According to Karl Guthke, last words as recorded in public documents are often reflections of the social attitude toward death at the time, rather than reports of actual statements. Published last words may reflect words that the dying person's intimates or supporters wished were their final testament.

Actual last words are typically less grandiose than those attributed to historical figures, and are also seldom published. Dying people frequently suffer delirium, diminished mental acuity, inability to speak clearly, or some combination of the three. McLeod stated that people near death do not normally remain mentally clear. Some do not speak before their death. "People will whisper, and they'll be brief, single words – that's all they have energy for." 

Actual final utterances are often short or difficult to interpret. Diminished breathing can limit volume, and medications, lack of energy, dry mouth, and lack of dentures can also frustrate communication. Last words are commonly the names of spouses or children, or banal utterances such as "Mama" and "Oh, fuck".

Reported last words of 21st century Americans include sensical comments ("I think I'm dying", "It's about damn time you got here! I've been waiting!", "Don't be sad") requests to medical staff ("Kill me", "Come here. Look at me! Help me!", "Please, please, please... don't tell my parents I was drinking"), indications of perceiving or addressing dead loved ones ("My mom's here. Are we going?", "Bill's here love, I've got to go", "Bob, Bob, here I come. Oh, honey I've missed you so much!") and indications of hallucinations ("They have no eyes", "I see a bright light... Horses... No eyes... No... NO... NO!"). One observer reported that their grandfather, who had served and been captured in WWII, began pleading for his life with his medical attendants, as he was hallucinating that they were his German captors from the war. The doctor present, speaking German, had the presence of mind to respond in German, telling the patient he was free. The observer noted their grandfather died right after.

See also
List of last words

References

Further reading